Eva Nadia González (born 2 September 1987) is a former Argentine footballer who played as a centre-back. At club level, she played for the Boca Juniors and represented Argentina at senior international level.

International career
In November 2006, González scored the opening goal in the final of the 2006 South American Women's Football Championship, which ended in a shock 2–0 win for Argentina against regional rivals Brazil. She locked out Brazilian stars Elaine and Cristiane to win the Albiceleste their first-ever South American title and earn a direct qualification spot for both the 2007 FIFA Women's World Cup and the 2008 Beijing Olympics.

At the World Cup in China, González had an eventful match against England. As captain, she scored England's first goal by misdirecting a header past her own goalkeeper and then scored a curling free kick at the other end. Argentina lost 6–1 and exited the tournament from the group stage after losing their other two matches: 11–0 to Germany and 1–0 to Japan.

References

External links
 
 

1987 births
Living people
Footballers from Buenos Aires
Argentine women's footballers
Women's association football central defenders
Boca Juniors (women) footballers
Argentina women's international footballers
Footballers at the 2007 Pan American Games
Pan American Games competitors for Argentina
2007 FIFA Women's World Cup players
Footballers at the 2008 Summer Olympics
Olympic footballers of Argentina